Mordellaria is a genus of tumbling flower beetles in the family Mordellidae. There are more than 10 described species in Mordellaria.

Species
These species belong to the genus Mordellaria:
 Mordellaria africana Franciscolo, 1956
 Mordellaria arakii (Nakane & Nomura, 1950)
 Mordellaria aurata (Kôno, 1928)
 Mordellaria aurofasciata (Comolli, 1837) g
 Mordellaria binotata Horák, 1995
 Mordellaria borealis (LeConte, 1862) i c g b
 Mordellaria fascifera (LeConte, 1878) i c g
 Mordellaria hananoi (Nakane & Nomura, 1950) g
 Mordellaria hesei Franciscolo, 1965
 Mordellaria kanoi Kono, 1932 g
 Mordellaria latior Nomura, 1967 g
 Mordellaria latipalpis (Ray, 1946) i c g
 Mordellaria pulchella Ermisch, 1954
 Mordellaria scripta (Fairmaire & Germain, 1863)
 Mordellaria serval (Say, 1835) i c g b
 Mordellaria undulata (Melsheimer, 1845) i c g b
 Mordellaria zenchii Tokeji, 1953
Data sources: i = ITIS, c = Catalogue of Life, g = GBIF, b = Bugguide.net

References

Mordellidae